Shihe is a district of the city of Xinyang, Henan province, China.

Administrative divisions
As 2012, this district is divided to 9 subdistricts, 3 towns and 6 townships.
Subdistricts

Towns

Townships

References

External links

Shihe District Government

County-level divisions of Henan
Xinyang